Harvey Wickes Felter (1865–1927) was an eclectic medicine doctor and author of Eclectic Materia Medica.  He was co-author, with John Uri Lloyd, of King's American Dispensatory.

Works
 Biographies of John King, Andrew Jackson Howe, and John Milton Scudder : accompanied by many valuable and historical portraits and other illustrations . Lloyd, Cincinnati, Ohio 1912 Digital edition by the University and State Library Düsseldorf

External links
King's American Dispensatory @ Henriette Kress's Herbal website.
The Eclectic Materia Medica, Pharmacology and Therapeutics by Harvey Wickes Felter, M.D. (1922) Bookmarked Acrobat (.pdf) files only from Michael Moore's website.

Herbalists
1865 births
1927 deaths